Julio Fuentes (born 31 December 1960) is a Chilean former modern pentathlete. He competed at the 1988 Summer Olympics.

References

External links
 

1960 births
Living people
Chilean male modern pentathletes
Olympic modern pentathletes of Chile
Modern pentathletes at the 1988 Summer Olympics
20th-century Chilean people
21st-century Chilean people